This is a list of artists on Republic Records, a Universal Music Group company.

0-9
3 Doors Down

A
AFI
AJR (joint with Mercury Records)
Akon 
Aminé
Angelina Jordan
Animal Liberation Orchestra (Brushfire Records)
Anthony Ramos
Andy Black (Lava Records)
Joseph Arthur (Real World Records)
Zee Avi (Brushfire Records)
Aziatix (Cash Money Records)
Thomas Azier (Casablanca Records)
Amanda Reifer (Republic Records)

B
Bahamas (Brushfire Records)
The Band Perry (Republic Nashville)
James Bay (Mercury Records)
Benee
Belly (XO Records)
Marc E. Bassy
Birdman (Cash Money Records)
B. Smyth (Young Money Entertainment/Cash Money Records/We the Best/Motown Records)
Birds of Tokyo (Lava Records)
Black Atlass (XO Records)
Black Sabbath (Vertigo/Republic) (US/Canada)
Black Veil Brides
James Blake
Bow Wow (Cash Money Records)
Danielle Bradbery
Dionne Bromfield
Andy Bull
Bo Burnham
Craig Wayne Boyd (Dot Records)
BoyWithUke

C
The Cab
Sofia Carson  
Brynn Cartelli
Caskey (Cash Money Records)
Charles Hamilton
Chris Richardson (Cash Money Records)
City Morgue (Hikari-Ultra Records)
Claire Rosinkranz
Alex Clare (Island Records)
Colbie Caillat
Matt Costa (Brushfire Records)
Crystal Castles (Casablanca Records)
Cut Copy (Loma Vista Recordings)
Tessanne Chin
Chelsea Cutler

D
DNCE
Drake (Young Money/OVO Sound)
Dengue Fever (Real World Records)
Dev

E
Eli Young Band (Republic Nashville)
Euro
Em Beihold

F
Florence and the Machine (US)
Florida Georgia Line (Republic Nashville)
Sawyer Fredericks
Flaw
Flo (Uptown Records (US))

G
G. Love (Brushfire Records)
Ghost (Loma Vista Recordings)
Zach Gill (Brushfire Records)
Ariana Grande
Conan Gray
Christina Grimmie (Island Records)
Peter Gabriel (Real World Records)
Glass Animals (US distribution)
Godsmack
Gotye
Greta Van Fleet (Lava Records)
Gudda Gudda (Young Money)
Cory Gunz (Young Money)
Get Scared (Fearless Records)

H
Neil Halstead (Brushfire Records)
Mayer Hawthorne
Angel Haze
He Is We
Paris Hilton (Cash Money Records)
Ace Hood (Cash Money Records)
Ben Howard
Hollywood Vampires
Sundance Head

I
Itzy (JYP Entertainment)

J
Paris Jackson
Jack Johnson (Brushfire Records)
James Graham
Jeremy Zucker
Jessica Sanchez
Jessie J (Lava Records)
Jonas Brothers
Julia Michaels
Justine Skye (Roc Nation)
JPEGMAFIA

K
Kalin and Myles
Kash Doll
KA$HDAMI
Kavinsky (Casablanca Records)
Mat Kearney
Klangkarussell (Casablanca Records)
Kid Cudi
Kira Kosarin
Kim Petras
King Charles 
Josh Kaufman

L
The Last Bison 
Kiana Ledé
Lifer
Lil Tecca (Galactic Records)
Lil Twist (Young Money)
Lil Wayne
Limp Bizkit (Cash Money Records)
Lindsay Lohan (Casablanca Records)
Little Dragon (Loma Vista Recordings)
The Lonely Island
Lorde (Lava Records)
Lyn Lapid

M
Seth MacFarlane
Madeon (Casablanca Records)
Clare Maguire
Maluca
Adrian Marcel
Damian Marley (Tuff Gong)
Ida Maria (Lava Records)
 Metro Boomin (Boominati Worldwide)
 Shawn Mendes (Island Records)
 Isabela Merced
Mika
Christina Milian (Young Money)
Nicki Minaj (Young Money)
James Morrison
Mystikal (Cash Money Records)
Matt McAndrew (The Voice (U.S. TV series) Season 7 Runner-up)
Maty Noyes
Mushroomhead

N
The Naked and Famous
Nav (XO Records)
Natalie La Rose
Noah Kahan

O
Of Monsters and Men
Oleander
Otto Knows (Casablanca Records)
Owl City
Oh Wonder (Joint UK deal with Island Records)

P
Pacific Air
Liam Payne (Joint UK deal with Capitol Records)
Pearl Jam
Phantogram
Picture this
Poppy (Lava Records)
Pop Smoke (Victor Victor Worldwide)
Cassadee Pope (Republic Nashville)
Post Malone (joint with Mercury Records, 2022-present)
The Presets (Casablanca Records)
Psy (P-Nation) 
Push Baby (School Boy Records)

Q
Quinn XCII

R
RDGLDGRN
Rhye (Loma Vista Recordings)
Chris Richardson (Cash Money Records)
Rilès
The Royal Concept (Lava Records)
Kevin Rudolf (Cash Money Records)
Rose Villain (Joint deal with Eddie O Entertainment)

S
Sage the Gemini
Sarah Hyland
The Score
The Secret Sisters
Shanell (Young Money)
Shania Twain (Republic Nashville)
Ski Mask the Slump God (Victor Victor Worldwide)
Snow Patrol
SoMo
Stafford Brothers (Cash Money Records)
Hailee Steinfeld
Rod Stewart
Sfera Ebbasta
Stromae
Swedish House Mafia
Taylor Swift  
Stray Kids (JYP Entertainment)

T
The Avett Brothers (American Recordings)
Trans-Siberian Orchestra (Lava Records),
TRI.BE (TR Entertainment)
Maxi Trusso (Pirca Records)
tana (Galactic Records)
Tyga (Young Money)
The Hollywood Vampires
The Soundtrack of Our Lives
TXT (Big Hit Music)
TWICE (JYP Entertainment)
The Score
The gospel heart

U
Us The Duo

V
Vado  (Cash Money Records)
Volbeat

W
Amy Winehouse
The Weeknd (XO Records)
Tim Westwood (Cash Money Records) 
Weezer
Karl Wolf

Y
The Young Professionals (Casablanca Records)
Youngblood Hawke
Yung Gravy

Z
Zendaya 
ZillaKami (Hikari-Ultra Records)

References

Lists of recording artists by label